Atilio José Demaría (19 March 1909 – 11 November 1990), Italianized as Attilio Demaria, was an Italian Argentine footballer, who played as a striker. He played club football in Argentina and Italy. At international level, he represented Argentina in the 1930 World Cup and Italy in the 1934 World Cup, reaching the finals of both tournaments and winning the latter edition of the competition.

Club career
Demaría was born in Buenos Aires. After starting his career in Argentina, he played 295 games for Internazionale of Italy between 1931 and 1943, scoring 86 goals for the club, also serving as the team's captain between 1940 and 1943.

Demaría also played for Gimnasia de La Plata, Estudiantil Porteño and Club Atlético Independiente in Argentina and Novara, Legnano and Cosenza in Italy.

International career
Demaría represented the Argentina national team on three occasions between 1930 and 1931, and took part in the 1930 World Cup, winning a runners-up medal. He was later also a member of the Italy squad that won the 1934 World Cup on home soil as well as the squad that won the 1933–35 Central European International Cup; in total, he made thirteen appearances for Italy between 1932 and 1940, scoring three goals.

Personal life
His younger brother Félix Demaría also played football professionally, including a season for Ambrosiana-Inter. To distinguish them, Attilio was referred to as Demaría I  and Félix as Demaría II. Attilio Demaría died in Haedo, Buenos Aires on November 11, 1990.

Honours
Ambrosiana-Inter
Serie A: 1939–40
Coppa Italia: 1938–39

Argentina
FIFA World Cup: Runner-up 1930

Italy
 World Cup: 1934
 Central European International Cup: 1933–35

External links
Profile on the Inter website 
RSSSF

1909 births
1990 deaths
Argentine people of Italian descent
Footballers from Buenos Aires
Italian footballers
Argentine footballers
Association football forwards
Dual internationalists (football)
Argentina international footballers
Italy international footballers
FIFA World Cup-winning players
1930 FIFA World Cup players
1934 FIFA World Cup players
Club Atlético Independiente footballers
Club de Gimnasia y Esgrima La Plata footballers
Inter Milan players
Novara F.C. players
A.C. Legnano players
Cosenza Calcio 1914 players
Argentine Primera División players
Serie A players
Serie B players
Italian sportspeople of Argentine descent
Italian football managers
Argentine football managers
Argentine expatriate footballers
Argentine expatriate sportspeople in Italy
Italian expatriate football managers
Argentine expatriate football managers